Pachypodistes is a genus of snout moths. It was described by George Hampson in 1905.

Species
 Pachypodistes angulata Hampson, 1916
 Pachypodistes goeldii Hampson, 1905
 Pachypodistes paralysisalis (Dyar, 1914)
 Pachypodistes sthenistis Hampson, 1916

References

Chrysauginae
Pyralidae genera